The Battle of Aleppo was a major military confrontation in Aleppo, the second largest city in Syria, between the Syrian opposition (including the Free Syrian Army (FSA) and other largely-Sunni groups, such as the Levant Front and the al-Qaeda-affiliated al-Nusra Front) against the Syrian government, supported by Hezbollah, Shia militias and Russia, and against the Kurdish-majority People's Protection Units (YPG). The battle began on 19 July 2012 and was part of the ongoing Syrian Civil War. A stalemate that had been in place for four years finally ended in July 2016, when Syrian government troops closed the rebels' last supply line into Aleppo with the support of Russian airstrikes. In response, rebel forces launched unsuccessful counteroffensives in September and October that failed to break the siege; in November, government forces embarked on a decisive campaign that resulted in the recapture of all of Aleppo by December 2016. The Syrian government victory was widely seen as a turning point in Syria's civil war.

The large-scale devastation of the battle and its importance led combatants to name it the "mother of battles" or "Syria's Stalingrad". The battle was marked by widespread violence against civilians, repeated targeting of hospitals and schools (mostly by pro-government air forces and to a lesser extent by the rebels), and indiscriminate aerial strikes and shelling against civilian areas. It was also marked by the inability of the international community to resolve the conflict peacefully. The UN special envoy to Syria proposed to end the battle by giving East Aleppo autonomy, but this was rejected by the Syrian government. Hundreds of thousands of residents were displaced by the fighting and efforts to provide aid to civilians or facilitate evacuation were routinely disrupted by continued combat and mistrust between the opposing sides.

There were frequent instances of war crimes during the battle, including the use of chemical weapons by both Syrian government forces and rebel forces, the use of barrel bombs by the Syrian Air Force, the dropping of cluster munitions on populated areas by Russian and Syrian forces, the carrying out of "double tap" airstrikes to target rescue workers responding to previous strikes, summary executions of civilians and captured soldiers by both sides, indiscriminate shelling and use of highly inaccurate improvised artillery by rebel forces. During the 2016 Syrian government offensive, the UN High Commissioner for Human Rights warned that "crimes of historic proportions" were being committed in Aleppo.

After four years of fighting, the battle represents one of the longest sieges in modern warfare and one of the bloodiest battles of the Syrian Civil War, leaving an estimated 31,000 people dead, almost a tenth of the estimated overall war casualties at that time. Fighting also caused severe destruction to the Old City of Aleppo, a UNESCO World Heritage Site. An estimated 33,500 buildings have been either damaged or destroyed.

Background 

In 2011, Aleppo was Syria's largest city, with a population of 2.5 million people. A UNESCO World Heritage Site, it has been described by Time as Syria's commercial capital. Author Diana Darke has written that "The city has long been multi-cultural, a complex mix of Kurds, Iranians, Turkmen, Armenians and Circassians overlaid on an Arab base in which multi-denominational churches and mosques still share the space."

Nationwide protests against President Bashar al-Assad began on 15 March 2011, as part of the Arab Spring. Anti-government protests were held in several districts of Aleppo on 12 August 2011, including the city's Sakhour district. At least two protesters were shot dead by security forces during a demonstration in Sakhour with tens of thousands of attendees. Regular large protests started in Aleppo in May 2012. During this period, government-organized rallies in support of Assad also occurred. However, Aleppo remained relatively undisturbed and largely supportive of the government during the 16-month-long conflict until 22 July 2012, when rebel fighters from the neighboring villages converged and penetrated into the city, to which the government responded with heavy-handed, indiscriminate bombardments. On 16 February 2012, the UN General Assembly issued a resolution with a vote of 137 in favour, 12 against, and 17 abstentions, and called on Syria "to immediately put an end to all human rights violations and attacks against civilians."

Combatants 

At the beginning of the Battle of Aleppo, rebels reportedly had between 6,000 and 7,000 fighters in 18 battalions. The largest rebel group was the al-Tawhid Brigade and the most prominent was the Free Syrian Army, largely composed of army defectors. Most of the rebels came from the Aleppo countryside and from towns including Al-Bab, Marea, Azaz, Tel Rifaat and Manbij. A resident of Aleppo reportedly accused the rebels of using civilian homes for shelter. On 19 November 2012, the rebel fighters—particularly the al-Tawhid Brigade and the al-Nusra Front—initially rejected the newly formed Syrian National Coalition. However, the next day the rebels withdrew their rejection.

By December, rebel fighters were commonly looting for supplies; they switched their loyalties to groups that had more to share. This new approach led to the killing of at least one rebel commander following a dispute; fighters retreating with their loot caused the loss of a frontline position and the failure of an attack on a Kurdish neighborhood. The looting cost the rebel fighters much popular support.

Islamic extremists and foreign fighters, many of whom were experienced and came from the ongoing insurgency in neighboring Iraq, joined the battle. Jihadists reportedly came from across the Muslim world. Jacques Bérès, a French surgeon who treated wounded fighters, reported a significant number of foreign fighters, most of whom had Islamist goals and were not directly interested in Bashar al-Assad. They included Libyans, Chechens, and Frenchmen. Bérès contrasted the situation in Aleppo with that in Idlib and Homs, where foreign forces were not common. Some FSA brigades cooperated with Mujahideen fighters. By 2016, the rebel factions still included internationally recognized terrorist groups such as Al-Nusra Front; they numbered 1,000 fighters in October 2016.

Hezbollah, which by 2013 joined the Syrian Civil War in support for President al-Assad, was also designated as a terrorist group by various organizations. The government retained some support in Aleppo; in 2012 a rebel commander said, "around 70% of Aleppo city is with the regime". During the course of the battle, Assad lost support from Aleppo's wealthy class. In 2012, CBS News reported that 48 elite businessmen who were the primary financiers for the government switched sides. For the first time, the government's Syrian Arab Army engaged in urban warfare. They divided their forces into groups of 40 soldiers each. These were armed mostly with automatic rifles and anti-tank rockets and artillery, tanks and helicopters were only used for support. In August 2012, the army deployed its elite units. Eventually, after rebel forces executed Zeino al-Berri, tribal leader of the al-Berri tribe, the tribe joined the fight against the rebels. Initially, the Christian community tried to avoid taking sides in the conflict. However, many Christians supported the Army and some formed militias aligned with the government following the capture of their quarters by the Syrian Army. Many Christian Armenians also supported the Syrian Army. Some of Aleppo's Armenians claimed Turkey supported the FSA to attack Armenians and Arab Christians. In 2012, one Armenian militia had around 150 fighters.

At the beginning of the battle, Aleppo's Kurds formed armed groups, most notably the Saladin Ayubi Brigade, which worked with the opposition. Units of the Kurdish Front, part of the FSA and allied with the Democratic Union Party (PYD), were formed later in 2013. The PYD had poor relations with both sides. Its People's Protection Units (YPG) stayed out of Arab areas and insisted the FSA stay out of the Kurdish area. They did not initially fight the Syrian Army unless attacked. The Kurdish areas in Aleppo mainly came under PYD control. At various points in the conflict, the Kurds joined the opposition against pro-government forces. However, the YPG-controlled neighborhood of Sheikh Maqsood came under a siege by both Syrian government forces and the rebels. In September 2015, the rebels accused the YPG of having a deal with the government, while the YPG accused the rebels of shelling the neighborhood. Between November and December 2015, the conflict between the rebels and US-backed Kurdish-led Syrian Democratic Forces (SDF) in the rest of Aleppo province escalated. Truce attempts largely failed to stop the fighting. The situation escalated in February 2016, when the SDF followed up on advances by the Syrian Armed Forces, backed by Russian airstrikes, and they themselves took territory north of Aleppo city from the rebels.

Starting in late September 2015, Russian warplanes carried out their very first attacks in Syria. The Russian bombing campaign included strikes against rebel forces in Aleppo.

Course of the battle

2012: Initial rebel attack and capture of Eastern Aleppo 

Gunfire between rebels and security forces broke out in and around Salaheddine, a district in the city's southwest, on the night of 19 July 2012.

In late July and early August 2012, the FSA continued its offensive in Aleppo, with both sides suffering a high level of casualties. Rebel commanders said their main aim was to capture the city center. On 30 July, the rebels seized a strategic checkpoint in Anadan, a town north of Aleppo, gaining a direct route between the city and the Turkish border—an important rebel supply base. They also captured Al-Bab, an army base northeast of the city. Opposition forces continued to gain territory in the city, controlling most of eastern and southwestern Aleppo, including Salaheddine and parts of Hamdaniyeh. They continued to target security centers and police stations as clashes erupted near the Air Force intelligence headquarters in Aleppo's northwestern district Zahraa. Rebels over-ran several police stations and posts in the central and southern districts of Bab al-Nerab, Al-Miersa and Salhain, seizing a significant quantity of arms and ammunition.

2013: Advances and counter-advances 

In December 2012, the al-Nusra Front unilaterally declared a no-fly zone and threatened to shoot down commercial aircraft, alleging that the government was using them to transport loyalist troops and military supplies. After multiple attacks on Aleppo International Airport, all flights were suspended on 1 January 2013. The following month, the rebels seized Umayyad Mosque; and during the battle, the mosque's museum caught fire and its ceiling collapsed.

On 9 June, the Syrian Army announced the start of "Operation Northern Storm", an attempt to recapture territory in and around the city. Between 7 and 14 June, army troops, government militiamen and Hezbollah fighters launched the operation. Over a one-week period, government forces advanced in the city and the countryside, pushing back the rebels. However, according to an opposition activist, on 14 June the situation started reversing after rebels halted an armored reinforcement column from Aleppo that was heading for two Shiite villages northwest of the city.

On 8 November, the Syrian Army started an offensive against the rebel-held Base 80, launching "the heaviest barrage in more than a year". Al Jazeera wrote that a government victory would cut the rebels' route between the city and al-Bab. Two days later, Reuters reported that the rebels had regrouped to fight the Syrian army. Fifteen rebels were killed and the army recaptured the base. The following month, the army partially besieged the city in Operation Canopus Star. During the offensive, Army helicopters attacked with barrel bombs, killing more than a thousand people, according to the Free Syrian Army's Abu Firas Al-Halabi.

2014: Syrian government encirclement of the rebels 

Government forces, having lifted the siege of Aleppo in October 2013, continued their offensive in 2014. This culminated in the capture of the Sheikh Najjar industrial district north of Aleppo and the lifting of the siege of Aleppo Central Prison on 22 May 2014, which contained a garrison of government soldiers that had resisted rebel forces since 2012. A ceasefire proposal was presented by a UN envoy in November; under the proposal humanitarian aid would be delivered to Aleppo following the cessation of hostilities. President Assad said the ceasefire plan was "worth studying", and according to the UN envoy the Syrian government was "seriously studying" the proposal. The FSA rejected the plan; its military commander Zaher al-Saket said they had "learned not to trust the [Bashar al-] Assad regime because they are cunning and only want to buy time".

2015: War of attrition 

In early January, the rebels recaptured the Majbal (sawmills) area of al-Brej and captured the southern entrance of the stone quarries known as al-Misat, forcing government troops to retreat to the north. Rebels also seized the Manasher al-Brej area. They tried to advance and take control of al-Brej Hill, with which they could seize the military supply road running between Aleppo Central Prison and the Handarat and al-Mallah areas. At the end of January, the rebels took control over some positions in al-Brej Hill.

In mid-February, the Syrian Arab Army and its allies launched a major offensive in the northern Aleppo countryside, with the aim of cutting the last rebel supply routes into the city, and relieving the rebel siege of the Shi'a-majority towns Zahra'a and Nubl to the northwest of Aleppo. They quickly captured several villages, but bad weather conditions and an inability to call up reinforcements stalled the government offensive. A few days later, the rebels launched a counter-offensive, retaking two of four positions they had lost to Syrian government forces.

On 9 March, opposition forces launched an assault on Handarat, north of Aleppo, after reportedly noticing confusion in the ranks of Syrian government troops after the February fighting. Opposition sources said the rebels had captured 40–50% of the village, or possibly even 75%, while the Army remained in control of the northern portion of Handarat. In contrast, a Syrian Army source stated they still controlled 80% of Handarat. On 18 March, after almost 10 days of fighting, the Syrian Army had fully expelled the rebels from Handarat, and re-established control of the village.

On 13 April, Islamist opposition forces and al-Nusra Front renewed their assault on the Air Force Intelligence building, utilizing a tunnel bomb followed by an assault. Much of the Air Force Intelligence building was reportedly damaged as a result of the tunnel bomb. Between 27–29 April, the FSA and Ahrar ash-Sham launched an operation in the old city of Aleppo and al-Hatab Square in the Al-Jdayde (Jdeideh) District, which included tunnel bombs and the shelling of buildings where soldiers were stationed. The rebels claimed to have killed 76 troops in these operations. Sahat Al Hatab square and the buildings around it were left devastated as a result of this operation. Numerous monuments, including churches, a mosque, the Waqf of Ibshir Mustafa Pasha Complex complex, the wool souk and al-Hatab Square were heavily damaged or destroyed by the explosions.

In preparation for a new offensive, the rebels heavily shelled government-held parts of Aleppo, leaving 43 civilians dead and 190 wounded on 15 June. On 17 June, rebel forces captured the western neighborhood of Rashideen from Syrian government forces. Throughout 19 and 20 June, a new round of rebel shelling killed 19 more civilians.

In early July, two rebel coalitions launched an offensive against the government-held western half of the city. During five days of fighting, the rebels seized the Scientific Research Center on Aleppo's western outskirts, which was being used as a military barracks. Two rebel attacks on the Jamiyat al-Zahra area were repelled. Government forces launched an unsuccessful counter-attack against the Scientific Research Center.

In mid-October, ISIL captured four rebel-held villages northeast of Aleppo, while the Army seized the Syria-Turkey Free Trade Zone, the al-Ahdath juvenile prison and cement plant. Meanwhile, the SAA and Hezbollah launched an offensive south of Aleppo, reporting they had captured  of territory in one month. By late December, reporting that they were in control of 3/4 of the southern Aleppo countryside.

By the end of 2015, only 80 doctors were left in eastern, rebel-held part of Aleppo, or only one for 7,000 residents, while only one bakery was left to serve 120,000 people.

2016: Supply lines cut, surrender, and evacuation 

By 2016, it was estimated that the population of rebel-held Eastern Aleppo had been reduced to 300,000, while 1.5 million were living in government-held Western Aleppo.

In early February 2016, Syrian government forces and their allies broke a three-year rebel siege of two Shi'ite towns of Nubl and Zahraa, cutting off a main insurgent route to nearby Turkey. On 4 February, the towns of Mayer and Kafr Naya were recaptured by government forces. On 5 February, the government captured the village of Ratyan, to the northwest of Aleppo.

On 25 June, the Syrian Army and allied forces began their long-awaited North-west Aleppo offensive. The ultimate goal of the offensive was to cut off the Castello highway, which would cut off the last supply route for rebels inside the city, thus fully encircling remaining opposition forces.

By late July, Syrian government forces had managed to sever the last rebel supply line coming from the north, and completely surrounded Aleppo. Both the 4.000 rebels as well as tens of thousands of civilians severely trapped in the rebel held part of Aleppo. The Syrian Army asked the rebels to stop fiercely resisting and asked them to lay down arms and surrender, The rebels rejected, vowing they will fight until the last opposition soul remains. However, within days, the rebels launched a large-scale counterattack south of Aleppo, in an attempt to both open a new supply line into rebel-held parts of the city and cut-off the government-held side. The whole campaign, including both the Army's offensive and subsequent rebel counter-offensive, was seen by both sides as possibly deciding the fate of the entire war.

After a week of heavy fighting, rebels both inside and outside Aleppo advanced into the Ramouseh neighborhood, linked up and captured it, while also seizing the Al-Ramousah Military Academy. With these advances, the rebels managed to cut the government's supply line into the government-held part of west Aleppo and announced the Army's siege of rebel-held east Aleppo had been broken. However, the new rebel supply line was still under Army artillery fire and being hit by air-strikes, making both sides essentially under siege. Since the rebel offensive started, at least 130 civilians had been killed, most by rebel shelling of government-held districts. 500 fighters on both sides also died, mostly rebels. However, on 4 September, the Syrian Armed forces recaptured the Technical College, Armament college and artillery college, thus imposing the siege on Aleppo once again. Later that week they recaptured the Ramouseh district and reversed almost all rebel gains made since 30 July. The Syrian Government forces then started an offensive to capture eastern Aleppo on 22 September, taking 15–20% of the rebel-held part of Aleppo.

Rebels started an attack on western Aleppo in late October, which failed, with government forces retaking areas in the south-west that they had lost to the rebel's late July offensive. The Syrian Army then launched an offensive, aimed at finishing rebel-held Aleppo once and for all, during which they captured the Hanano district, Sakhour district, Jabal Badro district, Bustan al-Basha district, Hellok district, Sheikh Kheder district, Sheikh Fares district Haydariyah district, Ayn al-Tal industrial district and reportedly the research housing south of Jabal Badro. They also captured the Ard' Al Hamra district, reportedly cutting rebel-held territory in Aleppo by 40–45%.

By 13 December 2016, only 5% of the original territory of the city remained in rebel hands. A ceasefire was announced and the fighting stopped in order to allow the evacuation of civilians and rebels. The buses were prepared for the evacuation. However, the deal fell apart the next day, when the Syrian Government resumed their intense bombing of eastern Aleppo, with both sides blaming the other for the resumed fighting.

The deal was revived on 15 December with first convoy of evacuees leaving. The evacuation was however suspended on the next day. Another deal was reached on 18 December and evacuation resumed later in the day. The evacuation again stalled on 20 December, but resumed on the following day. On 22 December, the evacuation was completed while the Syrian Army declared it had taken complete control of the city. Red Cross later confirmed that the evacuation of all civilians and rebels was complete.

Aftermath 
On 22 February 2018, it was reported that the YPG had agreed to hand over eastern districts of Aleppo city to the Syrian government. According to Syrian state television, this decision was made to reinforce positions around the region of Afrin, and to halt Turkey's offensive. This came days after pro-Syrian government fighters agreed to bolster the Kurdish forces in the northwest.

SOHR and a witness later said that Syrian government forces had entered the areas controlled by the Kurdish fighters. YPG spokesman Nouri Mahmoud however denied this claim. A YPG commander later stated that Kurdish fighters had shifted to Afrin to help repel a Turkish assault. As a result, he said the pro-Syrian government forces had regained control of the districts previously controlled by them.

Throughout the start of 2020, the SAA made advances in the Idlib and Aleppo countryside. On the 17th of February, they had regained control of the last rebel-held suburbs in Aleppo city, gaining full control for the first time since 2012.

Strategic analysis 
Rebel forces expanded into the countryside south of Aleppo to control sections of the M4 and M5 highways, effectively blocking ground reinforcements for the Syrian Army. Before the end of 2012, the Syrian Army in Aleppo was receiving sporadic supplies and ammunition replenishment by air or via backroads. The fall of Base 46, a large complex that reinforced and supplied government troops, was seen by experts as "a tactical turning point that may lead to a strategic shift" in the battle for Aleppo. In a November 2012, intelligence report, American publisher Strategic Forecasting, Inc. described the strategic position of government forces in Aleppo as "dire", and said the Free Syrian Army had them "essentially surrounded".

On 26 November 2012, rebels captured Tishrin Dam, further isolating government forces in Aleppo and leaving only one route into Aleppo. By late January 2013 Deputy Prime Minister Qadri Jamil said all supply routes to Aleppo had been cut off by opposition forces, comparing the situation to the Siege of Leningrad. By late February 2013, Aleppo International Airport was almost surrounded by rebel forces. Later, the Syrian Army regained control of the strategic town Tel Sheigeb, allowing them to approach the airport. In November 2013, the Syrian Army retook the town of al-Safira. This opened a road for the government to support the besieged Kuweires Military Airbase and Aleppo Power Plant.

In February 2014, it was reported that the army planned to encircle Aleppo and impose blockades and truces. It would also try to recapture Sheikh Najjar Industrial City to rebuild the economy and provide jobs. By October 2014, the army had seized Sheikh Najjar, reinforced Aleppo Central Prison and captured Handaraat, almost besieging rebel-held Aleppo. Tensions peaked in early April 2014, when a Syrian Republican Guard officer allegedly killed a Hezbollah commander during an argument over the opposition advance in al-Rashadin, and other pro-government militia groups sent as reinforcements, such as the National Defence Force, proved to be unreliable in combat. Effectively cutting off access was more difficult in Aleppo because rebels controlled more terrain there than in other cities. Rebels also have a strong presence in the countryside and around the border crossings with Turkey. In April 2014 government commanders inside the city were saying that contrary to implementing such a strategy, "the best [they] can do in Aleppo is just secure ... positions".

The attempted encirclement involved the SAA's attacks on Bustan Al-Pasha, Khalidiyyeh, the farms of Mazra'a Halabi, Al-Amariyya and Bustan Al-Qaseer. The rebels' strategic victory at the Siege of Wadi Deif resulted in threats to several main government supply lines. This cast doubt on government forces' ambitions to control the road from Hama to Aleppo and the Damascus-Aleppo international road, and has been seen as a personal defeat for Syrian Arab Army Col. Suheil Al Hassan.

Staffan de Mistura, the United Nations and Arab League Envoy to Syria, proposed a pause in fighting, but opinions about implementation were divided. The European Union warned that "cases of forced surrender imposed by the Assad regime through starvation sieges were labelled fallaciously as local cease-fires in the past." The Southern Front of the Free Syrian Army, which was gaining ground in Deraa province south of Damascus, warned that a freeze in fighting in Aleppo could hamper their advance, as pro-Assad forces could be redirected from Aleppo.

The Syrian government's defeat at the Second Battle of Idlib in late March 2015, which helped expand the influence of the al-Nusra Front, forced the Islamic State (IS) to expand its attacks in central Syria after it failed to block the Raqqa highway that branches out to the Syrian army's main supply route to Aleppo along the Khanasir-Athriya road. IS's aim would potentially be to establish the necessary conditions to attack Idlib and al-Nusra. The March–April IS offensive in central Syria led some volunteers defending the Homs-Aleppo highway to consider deserting to defend their hometowns.

According to Jane's Information Group, a possible offensive on Homs by both al-Nusra Front and IS working independently might force the government to move critical forces away from Aleppo to defend key supply routes. There were additional opposition gains during the 2015 Jisr al-Shughur offensive. Syrian government minister Faisal Mekdad stated in June 2015, "All our strategic planning now is to keep the way open to Aleppo to allow our forces to defend it". Media outlets have noted that powerful online campaigns are being conducted in a war of information regarding Aleppo.

The role of Turkey 
Turkey had sponsored rebel forces in Aleppo to a degree that eastern Aleppo was called "a Turkish card guarded by jihadis." However, Turkish policy changed in August 2016, moving thousands of rebel fighters away from the area west of Aleppo to counter the secular federalist Syrian Democratic Forces to the north (see Turkish military intervention in Syria). This reduced the forces available to try to lift the siege of Aleppo, ensuring its fall.

Casualties 

With over four years of fighting, the battle of Aleppo represents one of the longest sieges in modern warfare, which left an estimated 31,183 people dead, almost a tenth of the overall Syrian war casualties at the time. The Violations Documentation Center in Syria assessed the death toll. According to its records, between 19 July 2012 and 15 December 2016 there were 22,633 adult male deaths (73%), 2,849 adult female deaths (9.2%), 3,773 child male deaths (12.2%) and 1,775 child female deaths (5.7%). 23,604 or 76% of all fatalities were civilians, while only 7,406 or 24% were military deaths. Causes of death were explosions (910 deaths), shelling (6,384 deaths), field execution (1,549 deaths), shooting (9,438 deaths), warplane bombardment (11,233 deaths), chemical and toxic gas attacks (46 deaths) and others.

The pro-opposition monitoring group the Syrian Observatory for Human Rights (SOHR) gave a similar number: it registered that 1,612 days of fighting for Aleppo left 21,452 civilians dead. Among them were 5,261 children under the age of 18 and 2,777 women over the age of 18.

The Syrian Network for Human Rights (SNHR), a pro-opposition non-governmental organization, reported that the Russian bombardments killed at least 1,640 civilians in the Aleppo area: 1,178 civilians died between 30 September 2015 and 1 August 2016, while additional 462 civilians were killed from 19 September 2016 until 30 November 2016.

The International Committee of the Red Cross (ICRC) has described the fighting as one of the most devastating conflicts in modern times. It appealed: "The human cost of the fighting in Aleppo is simply too high. We urge all parties to stop the destruction and indiscriminate attacks, and stop the killing".

The ICRC also said that hundreds of civilians perished through the "indiscriminate shelling of residential areas across Aleppo". Several infectious diseases broke out in Aleppo and other areas in Syria during the civil war, including poliomyelitis, measles and cutaneous leishmaniasis. Food prices also grew astronomically during the war. A kilogram (two pounds) of sugar cost $21 at one point.

Allegations of war crimes

Syrian government and allies 

Aleppo suffered catastrophic damage during the four-year siege and battle. According to an Amnesty International report, government forces have been responsible for the majority of violations in the conflict in Syria. Ravina Shamdasani, a spokesperson for the Office of the UN High Commissioner for Human Rights, issued a statement in November 2016 which said that "strikes against hospitals, schools, marketplaces, water facilities and bakeries are now commonplace, and may amount to war crimes". During that phase of the offensive, about 250,000 civilians were left in the city. In November 2016, UNICEF estimated that nearly 100,000 children were living under siege in Aleppo. The 2016 offensive cut off the city from food supplies, and last time eastern Aleppo was reached with significant humanitarian supplies before the Syrian re-capture was the beginning of July in 2016. The Syrian government, aided by Russian army, used war planes to systematically bombard hospitals in the rebel-held areas of the city. By the end of November 2016, no functional hospitals were left, and over 20,000 people were displaced by the fighting. Human Rights Watch issued a statement reporting that the Syrian and Russian military campaign killed more than 440 civilians, including more than 90 children, between September and October 2016. It also deplored that airstrikes often appeared to be "recklessly indiscriminate".

Between 29 January and 14 March 2013, opposition activists reported about 230 bodies were found on the banks and in the Queiq River in Aleppo. They accused government forces of being the ones who executed the men since the bodies came down the river from the direction of government-held areas of the city. Human Rights Watch was able to identify at least 147 victims, all male and aged between 11 and 64. Human Rights Watch reported that family members of many of the victims testified that they were last seen in a government-controlled area or after they set out to cross into the area through two checkpoints, one manned by opposition forces and the other by government forces.

In May 2014, the UN Security Council voted for the International Criminal Court (ICC) to investigate war crimes in the Syrian Civil War, but the resolution was vetoed by Russia and China.

In 2014, the United Nations adopted Resolution 2139 which ordered the end of using barrel bombs in the battle. The Syrian Observatory of Human Rights stated that the Syrian army dropped 7,000 barrel bombs in the first five months of 2015, claiming the lives of 3,000 people. Amnesty International reported that barrel bombs killed 3,000 people in 2014. Channel4 reported that videos have emerged online showing the Syrian army using barrel bombs.

The Syrian government was accused of using the barrel bombs many times. Some of them were:
 Middle East Monitor reported 14 deaths allegedly caused by the bombs in the Kallasa and Qasila neighbourhood of the city in June 2015.
 CNN-IBN wrote about the government dropping barrel bombs in July in the neighbourhood of al-Bab causing the death of 35 and injuring 50 others.
 BBC News alleged the government dropped the bombs in May, leading to the death of 72 civilians.
 The Anadolu Agency of Turkey wrote that the bombs launched by the government forces in July killed 15 people.
 According to the Violations Documentation Center, barrel bomb attacks peaked between April and July 2014, with an average of 107 attacks per month, and decreased to an average of around 17 per month from September 2014 to March 2015.

The government denied using barrel bombs. In an interview to BBC, President Bashar al-Assad denied using "indiscriminate weapons" like barrel bombs in the rebel held territories. Assad said, "I know about the army. They use bullets, missiles and bombs. I haven't heard of the army using barrels, or maybe cooking pots."

Amnesty International issued a detailed report about Aleppo in 2015. It warned about the Syrian government use of imprecise explosive weapons on densely populated civilian areas, illustrating it with the example that eight barrel bomb attacks between January 2014 to March 2015 killed at least 188 civilians—while only one rebel was recorded among the fatalities. It concluded that the government forces in Aleppo deliberately targeted civilians and civilian objects, implemented "forced disappearances", used torture and other ill-treatment among the prisoners—and that this constitutes a crime against humanity.

Chemical attacks by the Syrian government on opposition-held areas in Aleppo were reported on 10 August and 6 September 2016. After these attacks, the victims reported they were suffering from a shortage of breath, coughing, reddened skin and eyes, and excessive tearing, and sought medical treatment in hospitals. Five people, including three children, died as a result. A UN report found that the Syrian government used the prohibited chlorine bombs in Aleppo, causing "hundreds of civilian casualties". Human Rights Watch also condemned the Russian army for using incendiary weapons in Aleppo, in violation of international law. Cluster bombs were also used both by the Russian aviation and the Syrian government. Russia was directly accused of war crimes several times for its part in the battle at the UN Security Council by the ambassadors of the United Kingdom, the United States and France, due to its use of bunker buster and incendiary bombs on urban residential areas.

On 19 September 2016, a UN/Syrian Arab Red Crescent (SARC) aid convoy was attacked at night, as well as a SARC warehouse and health clinic in Urum al-Kubra, a rebel-held town 12 km west of Aleppo. 20 civilians and one SARC staff member were killed, while food and medical aid, intended to reach Aleppo, was destroyed. Some witnesses on the ground at the time of the attack said they had heard helicopters during the attack. The United States accused Russian or Syrian government warplanes of perpetrating the attack, while Russia rejected the accusation. The UN said it was not in a position to determine how the attacked unfolded. The UN Operational Satellite Applications Programme (UNOSAT) said it believed the convoy was attack by airstrikes. United Nations investigators later concluded that the Syrian government was responsible for the attack in a "meticulously planned and ruthlessly carried out" air strike. The investigators stated in a report that the Syrian Air Force used barrel bombs and rockets to attack the convoy and that, after the initial attack, Syrian government jets strafed the survivors. According to the investigators, since these actions were carried out deliberately they constituted a war crime.

Following the re-capture of parts of Aleppo by the Syrian government, the Office of the United Nations High Commissioner for Human Rights reported that a pro-government Iraqi Shi'ite paramilitary group killed at least 82 civilians, including 11 women and 13 children, in the Bustan al-Qasr, al-Ferdous, al-Kallaseh, and al-Saleheen neighbourhoods on 12 and 13 December 2016.

In January 2017, the Syrian Network for Human Rights (SNHR) and the Violations Documentation Center (VDC) submitted evidence of alleged war crimes committed by militias backed by Russia and Iran to the United Nations Commission of Inquiry on Syria. According to the head of the SNHR, "sometimes the Russians exceed the regime in some kinds of violations" and he noted the similarities between the kinds of war crimes and violations committed by Russian forces and those of the Assad regime.

In February 2017, Breaking Aleppo, a report by the Atlantic Council's Digital Forensic Research Lab, utilized open source and digital forensic research to reveal both the Syrian government's atrocities and those of its supporters in the final months of the siege of Aleppo. In March 2017, the UN Independent International Commission of Inquiry on the Syrian Arab Republic documented violations including chemical attacks and civilian executions perpetrated between 21 July and 22 December 2016.

Rebels 
A UN envoy warned that rebels may have been committing war crimes due to their indiscriminate rocket warfare targeting civilians in Aleppo, while trying to lift the siege in October and November 2016. The Aleppo rebels used improvised artillery, including "hell cannons", makeshift mortar firing gas cylinders packed with explosives and shrapnel. UN High Commissioner For Human Rights Zeid Ra'ad Al Hussein stated that their use was "totally unacceptable" and constituted indiscriminate attacks as they were very difficult to aim correctly, frequently killing and maiming civilians in government-held areas. According to Zeid, their inaccuracy means they had no military purpose so he concluded their use was primarily to "terrorize the inhabitants of western Aleppo". The Syrian Observatory for Human Rights reported in December 2014 that between July and December 2014 the rebels killed 204 civilians using hell cannons. Professor of Law Mark A. Summers of Barry University School of Law, a legal expert previous assigned to the Office of the Prosecutor for the International Criminal Tribunal for the Former Yugoslavia, wrote that both the uses of barrel bombs and hell cannons is inaccurate and so randomly destructive that their use is illegal, and thus constitutes either the direct or indiscriminate targeting of civilians and civilian objects.

There have been reports that rebels have on multiple occasions indiscriminately shelled the predominantly Kurdish Sheikh Maqsood neighborhood. In mid-June 2016 Russia accused the rebels of causing the death of over 40 civilians in the month. A spokesman for the US-supported SDF also accused the rebels of causing 1,000 civilian deaths and injuries, through shelling of Sheikh Maqsood. There were allegations that the Army of Islam (Jaysh al-Islam) group may have used chemical weapons in Sheikh Maqsood on 7 and 8 April 2016, based on reports of eight treated patients. In May 2016, Amnesty International's regional director suggested that the attacks on Sheikh Maqsood constitute war crimes.

Rebel groups such as the al-Nusra Front, the Levant Front and the Ahrar al-Sham established Sharia law in areas they controlled, imposing torture or other ill-treatment as punishment. The al-Nusra Front maintained a prison at the "fetid, trash-strewn basement" of the Aleppo Eye Hospital where the group was headquartered. At this prison, some people were held for years and subjected to repeated torture. Human rights activists, lawyers and journalists have been subjected to kidnappings. In 2015, Amnesty International warned that "non-state armed groups have engaged in abductions and hostage-taking, as well as the arbitrary detention, torture, and other mistreatment of prisoners in Aleppo". According to a 2016 Amnesty International report, some of the rebel groups in the city engaged in summary executions, in some cases in public, on the basis of "quasi-judicial institutions". The victims were captured soldiers, government officials, rival group members, as well as civilians. Russian General Staff Lieutenant General Viktor Poznikhir claimed that the Syrian government discovered several prisons in East Aleppo on 15 December 2016 used by the opposition to detain, torture and in some cases murder their opponents, including civilians that refused to fight. At the conclusion of the battle, Syrian state media claimed the Army had found the bodies of 21 executed civilians in rebel prisons, citing the head of Aleppo's forensic unit. The Russian defence ministry also claimed the execution of dozens of people by the rebels, some showing signs of torture. The pro-opposition activist group the SOHR confirmed bodies had been found in the streets but could not verify how they were killed.

Denial of water and sanitation is considered a war crime. Water supplies in the city for tens of thousands of people were deliberately cut by the Jabhat al-Nusra group for several days in May 2014. Jaysh al-Islam also reportedly prohibited civilians from receiving food and supplies in one neighbourhood they controlled in December 2016. The rebel groups also hoarded food during the siege, allowing civilians to starve while they remained well-fed.

During the December 2016 evacuation, Jabhat Fateh al-Sham rebels burnt buses meant to evacuate sick and elderly civilians from two rebel-besieged Shiite villages in Idlib province, concurrently with the Aleppo evacuations.

Kurdish-led forces
Amnesty reported that, according to the Syrian Network for Human Rights, "at least 23 civilians were killed by YPG shelling and sniper attacks" in opposition-held areas in the city between February and April 2016.

Destruction of the city and heritage 
Time magazine wrote:
...the ongoing devastation inflicted on the country's stunning archaeological sites—bullet holes lodged in walls of its ancient Roman cities, the debris of Byzantine churches, early mosques and crusader fortresses—rob Syria of its best chance for a post-conflict economic boom based on tourism, which, until the conflict started 18 months ago, contributed 12% to the national income.

The Al-Madina Souq, a major souq (market) in Aleppo, was affected by a fire in September 2012. The Irish Times reported that around 700 to 1000 shops were destroyed by the fire, which had been caused by firing and shelling. The following month, there were reports of the Great Mosque of Aleppo being damaged by rocket-propelled grenades. Fighting with mortars and machine guns caused damage to the main gate and the prayer hall. The attack continued in the mosque till it was repelled by the army. The Citadel of Aleppo was damaged during Syrian army shelling.

On 2 October, Irena Bokova, the Director-General of UNESCO, expressed her "grave concern about possible damage to precious sites" and requested the combatants to "ensure the protection of the outstanding cultural legacy that Syria hosts on its soil". She cited the Hague Convention for protecting the heritage sites.
A 2014 report by UNITAR found, using satellite images, that 22 out of the 210 examined key structures had been completely destroyed. 48 others had sustained severe damage, 33 moderate damage and 32 possible damage. The destroyed sites included the Carlton Citadel Hotel, destroyed to its foundations in a bombing in 2014, the madrasas of al-Sharafiyya and Khusruwiyah. Damage to the Great Mosque of Aleppo, whose minaret had been destroyed, was confirmed. According to official estimates, 1500 out of the 1600 shops in the souqs had been damaged or destroyed.

The Washington Post wrote that the scale of devastation of Aleppo "evoked comparisons with cities like Grozny and Dresden". It noted, however, that the destruction was mostly concentrated in the rebel-held part of the city: about 70 to 80 percent of the destruction was in the east. UN satellite images determined more than 33,500 damaged residential buildings in the city, most of them multi-apartment blocks. The costs of reconstruction were estimated at between $35–40 billion. Al-Hakam Shaar and Robert Templer proposed that the deliberate destruction of Aleppo was a form of "urbicide".

Reactions

Media coverage 
The coverage of the siege of Aleppo in the Western media emphasised the suffering of civilians and often contained graphic pictures of injured and dying children. As there were almost no international journalists there, the reporting was outsourced to local activists linked to the rebels who held the city. This was significantly different from the news coverage of the sieges of Raqqa and Mosul carried out by the Coalition forces, where the civilian losses were downplayed.

Domestic reaction 
The Syrian President, Bashar al-Assad, said on the occasion of the 67th Anniversary of the Syrian Arab Army in August 2012, "the army is engaged in a crucial and heroic battle ... on which the destiny of the nation and its people rests ..." After gaining nearly complete control of eastern Aleppo, Assad referred to this success as an "important point in history of Syria". He also called upon remaining rebel factions to surrender in exchange for amnesty.

Aleppo victory celebrations 

A series of victory celebrations were held in Aleppo following the government forces' victory, attended by government supporters, including Aleppo's Christian community which has increasingly sided with the government. Large-scale outdoor Christmas celebrations were held publicly for the first time in years, with a Christmas tree lighting ceremony in the Al-Aziziyah neighborhood. Participants waved Syrian and Russian flags and held portraits of Syrian President Bashar al-Assad, Russian President Vladimir Putin, and Hezbollah leader Hassan Nasrallah. A Mass was held in Saint Elias Cathedral by Aleppo's Christian community for the first time in four years. According to Syrian TV, the Christmas celebration, however, was disrupted with a bomb that exploded at the event. The celebration, however, resumed several minutes after the bomb was detonated.

A May 2017 New York Times Magazine report from "Aleppo after the Fall" described the public experience in formerly rebel controlled East Aleppo as "a chaotic wasteland full of feuding militias—some of them radical Islamists—who hoarded food and weapons while the people starved" and quoted local sources as "no one is 100 percent with the regime, but mostly these people are unified by their resistance to the opposition" and people having experienced "a rebellion that is corrupt, brutal and compromised by foreign sponsors".

Foreign reactions 
 In October and December 2016, the UN held a "Security Council Emergency Briefing on Syria" to discuss the situation in Aleppo. However, no agreement was reached. The United States Ambassador to the United Nations, Samantha Power criticized the Syrian government, Russia and Iran, in a speech at the briefing, stating "to the Assad regime, Russia, and Iran—three Member States behind the conquest of and carnage in Aleppo—you bear responsibility for these atrocities." Comparing the situation in Aleppo to the mass killings in Halabja, Rwanda and Srebrenica, she addressed the Syrian, Russian and Iranian governments, asking them "are you truly incapable of shame?" UN humanitarian chief Stephen O'Brien appealed to the Security Council to stop the bombardment of eastern Aleppo, describing residents "scrabbling with their bare hands in the street above to reach under concrete rubble trying to reach their young child screaming unseen in the dust and dirt below their feet". The Russian ambassador, Vitaly Churkin, dismissed his speech, saying: "If I wanted to be preached at, I'd go to church".
 At an EU summit in December 2016, German Chancellor Angela Merkel said that Russia and Iran were responsible "for crimes committed against the Syrian population" by the Assad government and that these should not go unpunished. The US secretary of State John Kerry also said that "there is absolutely no justification whatsoever for the indiscriminate and savage brutality against civilians shown by the regime and by its Russian and Iranian allies over the past few weeks, or indeed over the past five years."
 Armenia began sending humanitarian aid to Aleppo in mid-October 2012. The aid was distributed by Red Crescent, the Armenian National Prelacy in Aleppo, the Aleppo Emergency unit, the Embassy of Armenia to Syria, and the Consulate General of Armenia in Aleppo. The Governor of the Aleppo Governorate, Mohammad Wahid Aqqad, said, "the Syrian people highly appreciate this humanitarian gesture of the Armenian people, underlining the strong Syrian-Armenian cooperation".
 The French Foreign Ministry said, "With the build-up of heavy weapons around Aleppo, Assad is preparing to carry out a fresh slaughter of his own people". Italy and the UN peacekeeping chief also accused the Syrian government of preparing to massacre civilians.
 As the Battle of Aleppo started, Saeed Jalili, the head of Iran's Supreme National Security Council, met with Assad in Damascus. Jalili said Iran would help Assad to confront "attempts at blatant foreign interference" in Syria's internal affairs, saying, "Iran will not allow the axis of resistance, of which it considers Syria to be an essential part, to be broken in any way". During the Tehran sermon on 16 December 2016, Ayatollah Mohammad Emami Kashani praised the "Aleppo triumph" as a "defeat of the infidels". In contrast, Iranian reformist and former director of Western Asian affairs in the Iranian Foreign Ministry, Mir-Hossein Mousavi, said that he cannot applaud at what happened in Aleppo, concluding it is "nothing but a two nights' joy and Tehran will be worrying for the next 30 years about it."
 The Russian Foreign Ministry issued an official statement condemning the bombing that occurred on 9 September 2012, in which more than 30 people were killed. The ministry stated, "We firmly condemn the terrorist acts which claim the lives of innocent people", on 11 September. The Foreign Ministry also called on foreign powers to pressure the armed opposition to stop launching "terrorist attacks". The Russian Consulate General in Aleppo suspended operations on 16 January 2013.
 Turkish Prime Minister Recep Tayyip Erdoğan urged international action, saying it was not possible "to remain a spectator" to the government offensive on Aleppo. Reuters reported that Turkey had set up a base with allies Saudi Arabia and Qatar to direct military and communications aid to the Free Syrian Army from the city of Adana. Reuters also quoted a Doha-based source, which stated that Turkey, Qatar and Saudi Arabia were providing rebel fighters with weapons and training.
 William Hague, the British Foreign Minister, said, "the world must speak out to avert a massacre in Aleppo".
 The United States stated it feared "a new massacre" in Aleppo by the Syrian government; "This is the concern: that we will see a massacre in Aleppo and that's what the regime appears to be lining up for". The United States condemned "in the strongest possible terms" the government SCUD missile strikes on Aleppo in late February 2013, saying they were "the latest of the Syrian regime's ruthlessness and its lack of compassion for the Syrian people it claims to represent".

Jan Egeland, Special Advisor to the UN Special Envoy for Syria, stated in November 2016: "I have not seen a place where there has been so much politicization, manipulation of aid, as we have seen in Syria in recent months. It has to stop!". He also called the bombardment and destruction of the city a "dark chapter" in modern history:

In his last press conference as the United Nations Secretary-General on 16 December 2016, Ban Ki-moon declared: "Aleppo is now a synonym for hell". The UN High Commissioner for Refugees delivered a statement on 17 December 2016, calling for an immediate end to the war in Syria: "With the situation in Aleppo, Syria's war has reached an historic low... Aleppo has become a metaphor for the disastrous situation that Syria is in today, with half the population having been forced from their homes." The Washington Post compared the destruction of Aleppo to the siege of Sarajevo in the 1990s.

On 20 December 2016, the United Nations Security Council approved "adequate, neutral UN monitoring and direct observation on evacuations from the eastern districts" in Aleppo.

Protests in solidarity with anti-government forces in Aleppo 
Rallies and demonstrations intended to show solidarity with Aleppo's besieged civilians, as well as protests against the Syrian government and its Iranian and Russian allies, were held in several cities across the world, organized by numerous groups. In Paris, the Eiffel Tower went dark on 14 December 2016, as a symbol of solidarity, and thousands protested in Paris' Stravinsky Square against Russia's role in the destruction of the city. Qatar cancelled its national day of celebration on 18 December 2016 in solidarity with Aleppo. German government spokesperson Steffen Seibert said that "the cries for help of the people caught up in the fighting for the beleaguered city of Aleppo are a harrowing reminder to the world". He also urged: "There must be an end to the killing and dying in Aleppo." Protests were also held in London, Sarajevo, Istanbul, Jerusalem, Gaza City, and Amman, with some protesters burning pictures of Vladimir Putin because of Russia's role in the siege.

Timeline 
 Syrian government supply lines cut between October 2012 and October 2013, before being re-established from the south.
 From mid-to-late 2014, the Syrian government captures the eastern and northeastern approaches to the city.
 Syrian government cuts the northern rebel supply route from Turkey in February 2016, and the last road into the rebel-held part of Aleppo city in July 2016.
 Syrian government siege of rebel-held parts of Aleppo from Summer into Fall 2016, two rebel counteroffensives repelled.
 On 12 December 2016, Syrian government forces had gained control of 98% of the formerly rebel-held east, and rebels were reportedly "near defeat".
 Syrian government and allies' victory reported on 12 December and declared on 13 December.
 City divided between a government-held west and rebel-held east, with two northern districts YPG-held, from July 2012 to November 2016.
 Thirty percent of the UNESCO World Heritage Site Ancient City of Aleppo has been destroyed in the fighting.

See also 

 Siege of Homs—Siege of the city of Homs (2012–2014) during the Syrian Civil War
 Rif Dimashq Governorate campaign—Battle for the control of Damascus and its surroundings
 Siege of Eastern Ghouta
 Palmyra offensive (2017)
 Siege of Kobanî
 Siege of Nubl and al-Zahraa—Part of the Battle for Aleppo
 Battle of Benghazi (2014–2017)
 Battle of al-Bab
 Operation Euphrates Shield
 Battle of Mosul (2016–2017)
 Raqqa campaign (2016–2017)
 Siege of Marawi
 List of wars and battles involving al-Qaeda

Notes

References

Bibliography

External links 

 "Aleppo After the Fall" by Robert F. Worth, New York Times Magazine, 24 May 2017
 Battle of Aleppo frontline maps
 Aleppo: Key dates in battle for strategic Syrian city BBC News, 13 December 2016
 Map showing level of building destruction, by United Nations Institute for Training and Research, for 18 September 2016
 "Aleppo aerial campaign deliberately targeted hospitals and humanitarian convoy amounting to war crimes", a Report by the Office of the United Nations High Commissioner for Human Rights, 1 March 2017

Aleppo
Chemical weapons attacks
Cluster bomb attacks
Iranian war crimes
Military operations of the Syrian civil war involving chemical weapons
Aleppo
Aleppo
Aleppo
Aleppo
Aleppo
Military operations of the Syrian civil war involving the Free Syrian Army
Military operations of the Syrian civil war involving the al-Nusra Front
Military operations of the Syrian civil war involving the Islamic State of Iraq and the Levant
Military operations of the Syrian civil war involving the Syrian government
Military operations of the Syrian civil war involving Hezbollah
Military operations of the Syrian civil war involving Russia
Aleppo
Military operations of the Syrian civil war involving Quds Force
Military operations of the Syrian civil war involving the People's Protection Units
Military operations of the Syrian civil war involving Ahrar al-Sham
Military operations of the Syrian civil war involving the Popular Mobilization Forces